Papori is a 1986 Indian Assamese language feature film directed by Jahnu Barua. The film stars Gopi Desai, Biju Phukan, Sushil Goswami, Chetana Das and Dulal Roy. The film was released in 1986.

Plot summary
The film is set in the political background of the Assam agitation during the 1983 election. It is a story about Papori whose husband Binod is falsely arrested for her murder. A smuggler rapes Papori and her husband is convicted of it. Phukan, a police inspector finds the true murderer but cannot arrest him because the killer enjoys political protection. During this time, her daughter ends up in the hospital, where she eventually dies.

Cast and characters
Gopi Desai as Papori
Sushil Goswami as Binod
Biju Phukan as Police inspector

See also
Jollywood

References

External links
 
Dolphin Films

1986 films
Films set in Assam
1980s Assamese-language films